William McLane may refer to:

William McLane (Washington state) (1819–1906), Olympia area pioneer and member of the Washington Territorial Legislature
William McLane (Pennsylvania politician) (1947–2010), member of the Pennsylvania House of Representatives